Candiace Dillard Bassett (born December 14, 1986), is an American singer-songwriter, television personality and actress. She is recognized for winning Miss United States in 2013 and starring in The Real Housewives of Potomac since 2018. In 2021, she released her debut album Deep Space.

Early life and education 
Bassett was born on December 14, 1986, in Biloxi, Mississippi. She grew up in Atlanta, Georgia with her parents, both physicians for the Air Force. Bassett has two siblings, Chris and Crystal. In 2009, she graduated from Howard University, an HBCU Washington, DC, with a Bachelor of Arts degree in communications and broadcast journalism. She served a tenure in the White House offices of Public Engagement and Intergovernmental Affairs under President Barack Obama and as a staffer for President Obama's 2012 re-election campaign. In December 2020, Dillard Bassett announced she had returned to Howard University to obtain a Masters of Business Administration degree, graduating in May 2022.

Pageantry 
Bassett has competed across many pageant systems, including Sunburst, National American Miss, National Miss American Coed, Georgia Miss American Coed, Miss Maryland USA, Miss District of Columbia USA, and Miss United States. She was crowned Miss United States 2013; during the national pageant she represented the District of Columbia. After winning Miss United States, Dillard went on to compete in Miss World America.

The Real Housewives of Potomac 
Initially titled Potomac Ensemble, The Real Housewives of Potomac was announced on November 11, 2015. The series is the network's second attempt to develop a reality series based in the Washington, D.C. area. Bassett joined RHOP as a cast member during the show's third season. The fourth season which began filming in August 2018, premiered on May 5, 2019. The season featured Dillard's wedding to Chris Bassett. In 2019, Bassett and former RHOP co-star Monique Samuels were both charged with second-degree assault of each other from the District Court of Montgomery County in Maryland after an alleged incident between Bassett and Samuels on October 16, 2019. The incident was featured on the show's fifth season.

Discography

Deep Space (2021)

References 

1986 births
21st-century American actresses
21st-century American singers
Actresses from Atlanta
Howard University alumni
Living people
Musicians from Atlanta
People from Biloxi, Mississippi
People from Potomac, Maryland
The Real Housewives of Potomac